The Auroue is a  long river in the Gers, Lot-et-Garonne and Tarn-et-Garonne  départements, south western France. It flows generally north.

Communes along its course
This list is ordered from source to mouth: 
Gers: Crastes, Puycasquier, Miramont-Latour, Pis, Taybosc, Goutz, Céran, Brugnens, Cadeilhan, Saint-Léonard, Urdens, Saint-Clar, Magnas, Lectoure, L'Isle-Bouzon, Plieux, Castet-Arrouy, Miradoux, Gimbrède
Lot-et-Garonne: Cuq
Tarn-et-Garonne: Dunes
Lot-et-Garonne: Caudecoste, Saint-Sixte, Saint-Nicolas-de-la-Balerme

References

Rivers of France
Rivers of Gers
Rivers of Lot-et-Garonne
Rivers of Tarn-et-Garonne
Rivers of Nouvelle-Aquitaine
Rivers of Occitania (administrative region)